The Cheshire County League was a football league founded in the north west of England in 1919, drawing its teams largely from Cheshire, surrounding English counties and North Wales.

Initially the league was dominated by the reserve teams of Football League clubs, but as the Central League became established for these teams, the non-league clubs won every title after 1938.

The outbreak of World War II in 1939 led to the league being split into Eastern and Western sections, with the winners of each playing for the overall championship in 1939–40, with the league then closing down for the duration of the combat until restarting in 1945.

In 1968 the league lost several clubs to the newly formed Northern Premier League. Despite this the league expanded in 1978 by adding a Division Two, but in 1982 the league ceased to exist after it merged with the Lancashire Combination to form the North West Counties Football League.

Honours

League champions

Division Two Champions

Members
During the league's history, 82 clubs and reserve teams played in the league:

Accrington Stanley
Altrincham
Anson Villa
Ashton National
Ashton Town
Ashton United
Atherton Collieries
Atherton Laburnum Rovers
Bangor City
Bootle
Burscough
Buxton
Chester
Chester Reserves
Chorley
Congleton Town
Connah's Quay & Shotton
Crewe Alexandra Reserves
Curzon Ashton
Darwen
Droylsden
Eastwood Hanley
Eccles United
Ellesmere Port & Neston
Ellesmere Port Cement
Ellesmere Port Town
Fleetwood Town
Ford Motors
Formby
Frickley Colliery
Glossop
Horwich RMI
Hyde United
Irlam Town
Kirkby Town
Leek Town
Leyland Motors
Macclesfield Town
Maghull
Manchester Central
Manchester North End
Marine
Middlewich
Middlewich Athletic
Monk's Hall
Mossley
Nantwich Town
New Brighton
New Mills
Northwich Victoria
Oldham Athletic Reserves
Ormskirk
Oswestry Town
Port Vale Reserves
Prescot BI
Prescot Cables
Prestwich Heys
Radcliffe Borough
Rhyl
Rossendale United
Runcorn
Salford
Saltney Athletic
Sandbach Ramblers
Sankeys of Wellington
Skelmersdale United
South Liverpool
St Helens Town
Stafford Rangers
Stalybridge Celtic
Stalybridge Celtic Reserves
Stockport County Reserves
Tranmere Rovers Reserves
Wallasey United
Warrington Town
Wellington Town
Whitchurch
Wigan Athletic
Wigan Rovers
Winsford United
Witton Albion
Wrexham Reserves

References

External links
ZFE Web
grid of final placings
links to final tables

 
Football in Cheshire
Defunct football leagues in England
North West Counties Football League